"Familiar Pain" is a song recorded by American country music group Restless Heart.  It was released in February 1992 as the second single from their compilation album The Best of Restless Heart.  The song reached #40 on the Billboard Hot Country Singles & Tracks chart.  The song was written by Walt Aldridge and Susan Longacre.

Chart performance

References

1992 singles
1991 songs
Restless Heart songs
Songs written by Walt Aldridge
Songs written by Susan Longacre
Song recordings produced by Josh Leo
RCA Records singles